The 2023 BYU Cougars football team will represent Brigham Young University (BYU) as a member of the Big 12 Conference during the 2023 NCAA Division I FBS football season. The Cougars will be led by seventh-year head coach Kalani Sitake and play their home games at LaVell Edwards Stadium. The season will be the first year that BYU will compete  in the Big 12.

Before the season

Coaching changes
On November 28, 2022 defensive coordinator Ilaisa Tuiaki announced his resignation. On December 7, 2022 Jay Hill was announced as his replacement leaving his head coaching position at Weber State University.  Hill was also given the title of associate head coach replacing Ed Lamb who was named the Head coach at Northern Colorado.  Preston Hadley joined Lamb at Northern Colorado as the defensive coordinator. Kelly Poppinga returned to BYU after stints with the University of Virginia and Boise State University as the special teams coordinator and defensive assistant.  On December 20, 2022 former NFL player Sione Pouha was hired as a defensive assistant coach.  On January 2nd, 2023 it was announced that Kevin Clune was not retained and the final defensive assistant coaching position was announced as Justin Ena who played for the cougars and coached with Hill previously.

2023 recruits

2022 returned missionaries

2023 other additions

2023 departures

Schedule

Game summaries

NuSkin BYU Sports Network
The NuSkin BYU Sports Network is owned and operated by BYU Radio and features the talents of Greg Wrubell (play-by-play), Riley Nelson (analyst), Mitchell Juergens (reporter/sideline analyst), and Jason Shepherd] (host) for the fourth consecutive year, with Ben Bagley subbing in for Jason Shepherd when he has women's soccer broadcasts. The network is in charge of producing and broadcasting all BYU Football pre and post game shows as well as coaches shows and live broadcasts.

Affiliates

BYU Radio- Flagship Station Nationwide (Dish Network 980, Sirius XM 143, KBYU 89.1 FM HD 2, TuneIn radio, and byuradio.org)
KSL 102.7 FM and 1160 AM- (Salt Lake City / Provo, Utah and ksl.com)
KSNA- Blackfoot / Idaho Falls / Pocatello / Rexburg, Idaho (games)
KSPZ- Blackfoot / Idaho Falls / Pocatello / Rexburg, Idaho (coaches' shows)
KMXD- Monroe / Manti, Utah
KSVC- Richfield / Manti, Utah
KDXU- St. George, Utah

Personnel

Coaching staff

Roster

Depth Chart

References

BYU
BYU Cougars football seasons
BYU Cougars football